Ionuţ Badea (born 14 October 1975) is a Romanian football manager and former player. He was most recently in charge of Liga I club UTA Arad.

Honours

Player
Dinamo București
Divizia A: 2003–04
Cupa României: 2000–01, 2003–04, 2004–05

Coach
Argeș Pitești
Liga II: 2007–08

External links
 
 Labtof.ro – Ionuț Badea

1975 births
Living people
People from Argeș County
Romanian footballers
Association football midfielders
Liga I players
Liga II players
FC Dacia Pitești players
FC Dinamo București players
FC Brașov (1936) players
ASC Oțelul Galați players
FC Vaslui players
FC Argeș Pitești players
Romanian football managers
FC Argeș Pitești managers
CS Pandurii Târgu Jiu managers
FC Universitatea Cluj managers
FC Brașov (1936) managers
ASC Oțelul Galați managers
FC Astra Giurgiu managers
FC UTA Arad managers
Liga I managers
Liga II managers